Hans-Jürgen Jansen (born 27 September 1941) is a retired German footballer.

Career

Statistics

1 1962–63 and 1963–64 include the Verbandsliga Niederrhein promotion playoffs. 1969–70 and 1970–71 include the Regionalliga promotion playoffs.

References

External links
 

1941 births
Living people
German footballers
VfL Bochum players
Association football midfielders
VfB Homberg players
20th-century German people